Michael Paul Johnson (born December 20, 1942) is emeritus professor of sociology, women's studies, and African and African American studies at Pennsylvania State University, having taught there for over thirty years. It is where he developed his typology (known as "Johnson's typology") for describing intimate partner violence.

Johnson is an "expert on domestic violence". He was a member of the editorial boards of the Journal of Family Theory and Review and the Journal of Marriage and Family.

Education
Johnson obtained his BA degree in sociology from Knox College (Galesburg, Illinois) (1965), his MA in sociology from the University of Iowa (1969), and his PhD in sociology from the University of Michigan (1974).

PAIR project
In 1981 a long-term study of courtship and marriage of 168 couples was implemented by Ted Huston. The project began at Penn State and was intended to last through the first two and a half years of marriage, but it was extended and extra waves of data were collected. In 1985 the project transferred to the University of Texas at Austin and a follow-up set of interviews with the participants took place in 1991. Johnson has been a collaborator on the PAIR project since its early days, with a particular interest in 'conceptions of commitment'.

Johnson's typology

Johnson argues that there are four major types of intimate partner violence, a finding supported by some but rejected by others. The types of violence identified by Johnson are:
Situational couple violence
Intimate terrorism
Violent resistance
Mutual violent control: Johnson describes this as a couple who "could be viewed as two intimate terrorists battling for control".

View on feminism
Johnson describes his definition of feminism as:

Personal life
Johnson is retired and living in the foothills of the Appalachians with his partner Maureen; he also has two children and a grandchild.

Selected bibliography
Book

Journal articles
 
  Pdf.
 
  
  (A satirical regression.)
  Pdf.
  Pdf.
  Pdf.
  
 
  Pdf.
  Pdf.
  Pdf.
  Pdf.
Also see:  Pdf.
  Word doc.
A response to:  Word doc.
  Pdf.
  Pdf.
  Pdf.
  Pdf.
A response to: 
Erratum: 
  Pdf.
  Pdf.
  PDF

References

External links

Further reading
Interview
 

Johnson's Typology
 
 
 
 
 
  Preview.
 

1942 births
Knox College (Illinois) alumni
Living people
Male feminists
Pennsylvania State University faculty
University of Iowa alumni
University of Michigan College of Literature, Science, and the Arts alumni